Sand Springs or Sand Spring can be:

Places
 Sand Spring, Maryland
 Sand Springs, Montana
 Sand Springs, Oklahoma

Other
Sand Springs Range, a mountain range located in western Nevada 
Sand Spring Run, a stream in Pennsylvania
Sand Springs Railway, a class III railroad operating in Oklahoma 
Sand Springs Station, a Pony Express station near Sand Mountain, Nevada
Fort Churchill and Sand Springs Toll Road